The 2004 Grand Prix of Portorož was a non-championship Formula 3000 race held on a temporary circuit at Portorož Airport, Portorož, Slovenia on 2 October 2004.

It was contested over five laps by eight drivers from four Italian teams that had contested that year's International F3000 championship: Coloni Motorsport, CMS Performance, Durango and AEZ IE Engineering. All eight drivers used Lola B02/50 chassis with Zytek engines, as in the championship.

Austrian driver Patrick Friesacher won the race for Coloni, with Italians Matteo Meneghello and Matteo Bobbi second and third respectively for CMS.

Race result

References

Formula 3000
Motorsport in Slovenia